The North Caucasus Railway is a  broad gauge Russian railway network that links the Sea of Azov (in the west) and Caspian Sea (in the east). It runs through ten federal subjects: Rostov Oblast, Krasnodar Krai, Stavropol Krai, Republic of Adygeya, Karachay–Cherkessia, North Ossetia, Ingushetia, Chechnya, Dagestan, and Kalmykia. The headquarters are the North Caucasus Railway Administration Building in Rostov-on-Don.

The network comprises Grozny, Krasnodar, Makhachkala, Mineralnye Vody, and Rostov passenger and freight railways, as well as two children's railways (in Vladikavkaz and Rostov). , there were 6315.9 km of railtrack and 403 railway stations. The railway is operated by the Russian Railways and employs 80,757 people.

The Black Sea resorts of Sochi, Gelendzhik and Anapa are the principal passenger destinations on the railway. The Sochi line, running for many miles along the coast of the Black Sea, is especially busy in summer with regular extra direct express trains for holiday makers. The oil ports at Novorossiysk and Tuapse are significant destinations for rail freight traffic.

Major railway stations

Rostov-on-Don
Bataysk
Taganrog-II
Likhaya
Tikhoretskaya
Kavkazskaya
Armavir
Mineralnye Vody
Makhachkala
Timashevskaya
Krasnodar
Tuapse
Belorechenskaya
Salsk
Novorossiysk
Novocherkassk

Construction timeline 

1861 Shakhtnaya–Aksay (the first rail line in Northern Caucasus)
1871 Zverevo–Shakhtnaya
1872 Rostov-on-Don–Vladikavkaz
1875 Aksay–Rostov-on-Don
1888 Tikhoretskaya-Novorossisk
1897-Kavkazskaya-Stavropol
1901 Kavkazskaya–Krasnodar
1911 Bataysk–Azov
1911 Sosyka–Yeysk
1911 Armavir–Maikop
1912 Belorechenskaya–Tuapse
1914 Krasnodar–Akhtari
1914 Krymskaya–Timashevsk–Kushchevka
1915 Bataysk–Salsk
1915 Prokhladnaya–Gudermes
1916 Palagiada–Vinodelnoye 
1923 Tuapse–Sochi
1927 Sochi–Matsesta–Adler
1928 Petrovskoye Selo–Blagodarnoye
1931 Vinodelnoye–Divnoye
1931 Rostov-on-Don–Khapry
1931 Komsomolskaya–Neftegorsk
1931 Maikop–Khadzhokh
1940 Labinskaya–Shedok
1942 Gudermes–Astrakhan
1942 Adler–Sukhumi
1944 Krymskaya–Starotitarovka
1969 Divnoye–Elista
1971 Zverevo–Krasnodonskaya
1977 Anapa–Yurovsky
1978 Krasnodar–Tuapse
1987 Blagodarnoye–Budyonnovsk
1989 Peshchanokopskaya–Krasnaya Gvardiya

In 1937 the North Caucasus Railway was renamed after the Soviet party leader Sergo Ordzhonikidze but soon reverted to its traditional name. It was in the late 1950s that most of the railway network was electrified.

Railway lines in Russia
Railway companies established in 1861
North Caucasus
1861 establishments in the Russian Empire